The Hall of Honor was established by the Texas Military Department in 1980 to "recognize outstanding service and leadership" of Texas Military Forces service members operating under state or federal command. As of 2018, it has 120 inductees.

The Hall of Honor is hosted by the Texas Military Forces Museum at Camp Mabry. It is both an exhibit with a digital kiosk that showcases inductee biographies, and an eponymous conference center that may be rented for conventions or banquets. Inductees also receive a trophy, which has varied in type since 1980.

Criteria 

Any former, living or deceased, service member or civilian employee of the Texas Military Department
 Service members must have received an honorable discharge
 Nominees must have retired/resigned at least three (3) years prior to the nomination date
 Nominees must have performed a service/deed, while serving or employed, that reflects "great credit" upon the Texas Military Department
 Nominees must have made an extraordinary and positive difference in the continual transformation of the Texas Military, changing the outlook and focus of the organization and/or shaping the organizational environment for the future

Source:

Inductees

See also 

 Texas Ranger Hall of Fame and Museum
 Awards and decorations of the Texas government
 Texas Military Forces
 Texas Military Department
 List of conflicts involving the Texas Military
 Awards and decorations of the Texas government

References 

Texas Military Department
Texas Military Forces
Awards and decorations of the Texas Military Forces